The Cabinet of Angola is the chief executive body of the Republic of Angola.

References

External links
governo.gov.ao (in Portuguese)

Cabinet
Angolan ministers
Ministers
Angola